Wolf Caspar Klengel, from 1664 von Klengel (8 June 1630 – 10 January 1691), was a German architect in Saxony,

Klengel was born in Dresden, the second son of Caspar Klengel. He built in Dresden the first opera house, the Opernhaus am Taschenberg, and in 1672 the chapel of Schloss Moritzburg, among others.

In 1677 he remodelled the Georgskapelle in Meissen Cathedral where George the Bearded is buried.

Literature 

 Eberhard Hempel: Unbekannte Skizzen von Wolf Caspar von Klengel, in: Abhandlungen der Sächsischen Akademie der Wissenschaften zu Leipzig. Phil.-hist. Klasse, Bd. 59, H. 4, Berlin 1958.
 Steffen Delang: Das Dresdner Schloß in der zweiten Hälfte des 17. Jahrhunderts, in: Das Dresdner Schloß. Monument sächsischer Geschichte und Kultur, Dresden 1989, S. 68–71.
 Hermann Heckmann: Baumeister des Barock und Rokoko in Sachsen, Berlin 1996, S. 32–43.
 Mario Titze: Baugeschichte und Baugestalt der Dreifaltigkeitskirche in Carlsfeld im Erzgebirge, in: Die Dresdner Frauenkirche, Jahrbuch Bd. 3, Weimar 1997, S. 131–141.
 Mario Titze: Das ehemalige kurfürstlich-sächsische Gestüt Bleesern. Ein Bauwerk Wolf Caspar von Klengels, in: Denkmalpflege in Sachsen-Anhalt, 1998/1, S. 53–59.
 Günter Passavant: Wolf Caspar von Klengel, Dresden 1630–1691. Reisen – Skizzen – Baukünstlerische Tätigkeiten, München/Berlin 2001, .
 Stephan Reinert: Das ehemals Landsbergersche Spitzhaus – ein Bau Wolf Caspar von Klengels? In: 
 Mario Titze: Neue Forschungen zum Vorwerk Bleesern, Ldkr. Wittenberg, in: Burgen und Schlösser in Sachsen-Anhalt, Heft 11/2002, S. 368–383.

External links 

 
 Informationen zu Dresden im Frühbarock und von Klengel

German Baroque architects
1630 births
1691 deaths